1950s in Ghana details events of note that happened in Ghana in the years 1950 to 1959.

Incumbents
Prime Minister: Kwame Nkrumah from 1957 to 1960

Events
1957 March - Ghana becomes independent with Kwame Nkrumah as prime minister.
 1958, 5–13 December - Ghana hosts the first All-African Peoples' Conference
 1959 - Ghana Academy of Arts and Sciences established

National holidays
 January 1: New Year's Day
 March 6: Independence Day
 May 1: Labor Day
 December 25: Christmas
 December 26: Boxing day

In addition, several other places observe local holidays, such as the founding of their towns. These are also "special days."

References